Princess Margaret Secondary School (also known as PMSS or "Maggie") is a public secondary school in Penticton, British Columbia, Canada.   It is operated by School District 67 Okanagan Skaha.  It is one of two secondary schools in Penticton and one of three in the school district.  The school is fed from four elementary schools and one middle school. The school includes a significant number of students from the local First Nations Penticton Indian Band and is located within the traditional Okanagan Nation territory.   PMSS is named for Princess Margaret, Countess of Snowden, sister of Elizabeth II, Queen of Canada.

Academics
During 2005-2011 an average of 91% of first time Grade 12 students graduated.

Activities & elective programs
Learning Centre 
Aboriginal Education Program
AIM (Alternate Instruction At Maggie)
Student Voice (Students' Council)
Leadership Class
Peer Counsellors
Horseshoe Theatre
Adventure Tourism
Peer Tutors 
Work Learn 
Female Fitness
Fine Arts
Work Experience/Career Prep.
Cafeteria Training
Super Fit
Intramurals
Athletics
Sports Academy
Photography
Yearbook

Physical Education
The following programs are offered through the school's PE department:
Soccer
Volleyball
Outdoor Games
Dance
Basketball
Weight Training
Wrestling
Self-Defense
Gymnastics
Softball
Golf
Racquet Sports
Community Life
Active Health
Cooperative Games
Flag Football
Bowling
Curling
Driver's Ed
Badminton
Female Fit
Rock Climbing
Adventure Tourism
Female Fit
Multi-Sport
Soccer Center
SuperFit
Weight Training
Strength & Conditioning

History and facilities
The school officially opened in September 1958 with 200 students enrolled in Grades 2‐9.   The next year, Grades 1 and 10 were added. Due to a growing population at the south end of the city, an elementary school, Snowdon Elementary, was built on the grounds in the early 1960s, and students from Grades 7 - 10 attended PMS. In 2002 the school was converted to a grade 9-12 secondary school and underwent a $9.4 million renovation that also expanded its capacity from 475 to 650.

References

External links
Fraser Institute School Report Card

High schools in British Columbia
Buildings and structures in Penticton
Schools in the Okanagan
Educational institutions in Canada with year of establishment missing